Frack may refer to:

 Frick and Frack (1919–2008), nicknames for an ice skating duo
 Fracking, to use the hydraulic fracturing method for extracting oil and natural gas
 , a Russian ship sunk in 1915 by a German submarine

See also
 Frac (disambiguation)
 Frak (disambiguation)
 Frakk, a fictional Hungarian cartoon character
 Phrack, an ezine for hackers